Margaret Ponce Israel (also known as Marge Israel) (December 24, 1929 — April 22, 1987) was a painter and ceramicist who lived and worked in New York City. 

She was born in 1929 in Havana, Cuba, and brought to the U.S. as an infant. She attended the High School of Music & Art in New York and Syracuse University. She studied ceramics at Greenwich House Pottery, where she eventually became an instructor. She also studied in Paris, France, at the École nationale supérieure des Beaux-Arts, the Stanley William Hayter Graphic Art Studio, Atelier 17, and the Académie de la Grande Chaumière. In 1956 Israel won both first and second prize in ceramics at the Young Americans exhibition at the Museum of Contemporary Crafts, today the Museum of Arts and Design. She taught at Parsons School of Design, Greenwich House Pottery, the High School of Music & Art, and Y.M.H.A., all in New York City.

She was married to New York artist Marvin Israel from 1950 until his death in 1984. 

She died in 1987, aged 57, in Manhattan after being hit by a tractor-trailer while riding her bike on West 23rd Street. Upon her death, her studio was overflowing with artwork. Her studio and home was a three-story building in Manhattan that was once a horse stable. There she housed a bantam rooster, guinea hens, doves, a rabbit, dogs, and a cat. Her works depict many of these animals, and an exhibition of her work entitled A Domestic Bestiary was shown at the Perimeter Gallery in Chicago in February 1998.

Exhibitions 
 1959 - Charles Egan Gallery, New York City
 1961 - Charles Egan Gallery, New York City
 1971 - Cordier & Ekstrom, New York City
 1972 - Bestiary, Cordier & Ekstrom, New York City
 1988 - Garth Clark Gallery, New York City
 1990 - Baruch College, New York City
 1990 - Retrospective, Twining Gallery, New York City
 1991 - Perimeter Gallery, Chicago, IL
 1995 - 25th Anniversary Exhibition, Jane Hartsook Gallery, Greenwich House Pottery, New York City
 1995 - The Nude in Clay, Perimeter Gallery, Chicago, IL
 1995 - Artists' Artist, Studio School Museum, New York City
 1996 - The Nude in Clay, Charles A. Wustum Museum of Fine Arts, Racine, WI
 1996 - The Magical Art of Construction, Perimeter Gallery, Chicago, IL
 1997 - Susan Teller Gallery, New York City
 1997 - A Domestic Bestiary, Charles A. Wustum Museum of Fine Arts, Racine, WI
 1997 - Retrospective, Perimeter Gallery, Chicago, IL
 1998 - A Domestic Bestiary, Perimeter Gallery, Chicago, IL
 1999 - 1945-1985: Hannelore Baron, Dorothy Dehner and Margaret Ponce Israel, Perimeter Gallery, Chicago, IL

References

External links 
 Neuberger
 

1929 births
1987 deaths
Cuban women painters
American women painters
20th-century Cuban painters
American ceramists
Cuban ceramists
American women ceramists
Cuban women ceramists
Atelier 17 alumni
20th-century Cuban artists
20th-century American women artists
20th-century ceramists